Constituency NA-141 may refer to:
 NA-141 (Okara-I), a constituency of the National Assembly of Pakistan
 NA-141 (Kasur-IV), a former constituency of the National Assembly of Pakistan

National Assembly Constituencies of Pakistan